Hasanabad (also Romanized as Ḩasanābād) is a city and capital of Jarqavieh Olya District (Upper Jarqavieh District), in Isfahan County, Isfahan Province, Iran. At the 2006 census, its population was 4,342, in 1,197 families.

References

External links

Populated places in Isfahan County

Cities in Isfahan Province